There have been several spinoff novels and short stories from the computer game Star Wars: Republic Commando, known as the Republic Commando Series. Although there is a degree of intertextuality between these stories, they can be split into several defined story arcs that can be read individually from each other. Although clone commandos appear in many stories, such as Dark Lord: The Rise of Darth Vader and Jedi Trial, this list only deals with direct spinoffs from the Republic Commando franchise. The Science Fiction book club released an edition of the first two Republic Commando books in an omnibus hardcover.

Bibliography

Novels
 Star Wars Republic Commando: Hard Contact (October 26, 2004) Book 1
 Star Wars Republic Commando: Triple Zero (February 28, 2006) Book 2
 Star Wars Republic Commando: True Colors (October 30, 2007) Book 3
 Star Wars Republic Commando: Order 66 (September 16, 2008) Book 4
 Star Wars Imperial Commando: 501st (October 27, 2009) Book 5

Short Stories
 Omega Squad: Targets (Reprinted in Triple Zero)
 Odds (Reprinted in True Colors)

Comics
 Honor Bound
 The Package
 Orders

Games
 Star Wars: Republic Commando
 Star Wars: Battlefront 2

Story arcs within the series

The Omega Squad stories
Written by Karen Traviss, this series of novels and short stories primarily features Omega Squad, along with other recurring characters such as Etain Tur-Mukan, Kal Skirata, Captain Ordo (also known as N-11) and Jinart the Gurlanin.
 Star Wars Republic Commando: Hard Contact
 Omega Squad: Targets
 Star Wars Republic Commando: Triple Zero
 Odds
 Star Wars Republic Commando: True Colors
 Star Wars Republic Commando: Order 66

The Sarge stories
Written by Ryan Kaufman for the Clone Wars Adventures anthologies, this short series of two comics follows Republic Commando RC-1013 "Sarge" through various missions during the Clone Wars.
 The Package
 Orders

Other stories
These tales are standalone stories, which have yet to be referenced by any other text in the series.
 Honor Bound

References

 
 

Book series introduced in 2004
Novel sequences
Republic Commando
Science fiction book series
Republic Commando series
Mobile games
Republic Commando